University High School, often referred to as "U-Hi" or "U-High", is a public high school for grades nine through twelve in Spokane Valley, Washington, United States. It is part of the Central Valley School District in Spokane Valley. 

The current building is capable of housing around 1650 students. Because of the growing number of students attending, U-High is no longer accepting additional students, and many of the teachers must trade classrooms during the day.

Facility

The building opened in late 2002, and has  of space sits on a  site. The school has 75 teaching stations divided among general classrooms, business, science, art, music, professional-technical and health/fitness areas. The commons/cafeteria area accommodates 800 students for lunch and is a multipurpose area that can also be used for dances and large gatherings. The theater seats 575 and is used for music concerts, drama productions and guest speakers. The gym seats 2,030 for athletic contests.

Schedule
University High School switched from a trimester system to a semester system in 2010.  One semester is 90 days, and each class is 0.5 credit. There are six classes a day; on Mondays, Wednesdays, and Fridays, students attend TAP (Titan Advisory Period).  This is a time when students can do homework, and it also serves as a sort of 'homeroom', even though it follows 1st period.  Students take the HSPE (High School Proficiency Exam) during this class (TAP is extended during HSPE week), and seniors finish their senior projects during this time as well. Additionally, students register for their next year in TAP, and other various school-related activities occur during this time, such as assemblies.  TAP has the same students with the same teacher for all four years of high school.  Regular classes are 50 minutes long and TAP is 25 minutes long.

Hours
On Mondays, Wednesdays, and Fridays, classes are from 7:40 to 2:15.  On Tuesdays and Thursdays, there is Student Access Time from 7:35 to 8:15, and classes start at 8:15 and end at 2:15.  Student Access Time has two purposes: one purpose is Teacher Collaboration time, and the other purpose is a time for students to meet with their teachers to get help either on homework or classwork.

Classes and curriculum
University contains a wide variety of classes available to students. Certain classes are required throughout each year, while other classes are optional.

Math: Until recently, University had used a math curriculum known as "CMIC." This took students from basic algebra to Pre-Calculus, extending from Freshmen to Senior year. New curriculum is currently being implemented. Special math classes are also available for students who need it, and those who fail the math WASL (Washington Assessment of Student Learning) take additional math classes.

Language: Basic language classes are offered at the school. When a student reaches his or her junior year (or in rare cases, his or her sophomore year), he/she may take AP (Advanced Placement) classes for language and composition.

Foreign Language: Spanish, French, and German are offered.

History: The school requires its students to take global studies; in later years, they may sign up for history or AP U.S. history. During senior year, students can take AP European history.

Health: Both health and fitness classes are available, some mandatory and others optional.

Arts: The school offers band, drama, choir, painting, calligraphy, pottery, and drawing.

CTE: "Career and Technical Education" There are 4 specific areas for a career choice. They include: business, auto tech, communications, and cooking classes

Clubs and activities
U-High has many clubs and activities.  Amateur radio club, ASB/Leadership, Anime/Asian Culture club, Crimson Crew (Crimson Crew is a group of 200 juniors and seniors who help freshman make the transition into high school), Debate Club, DECA (Distributive Education Clubs of America), Destination Imagination, Drama, Electronic Communications (radio, broadcasting, etc.), FACSE, FBLA (Future Business Leaders of America), First Priority (Christian club), French club, GSA (Gay-Straight Alliance),  German club, National Honor Society, Human and Animal Rights Club, Junior Statesmen, Key Club, Knowledge Bowl, Math Club, Spanish club, TSA (Technology Student Association), theater, orchestra, marching band, concert band, jazz band, choir (Chanteuse Treble Choir, Concert Choir, University Choir, Lirico Chamber Singers, Titan Jazz Choir (Kronos)), lacrosse club (which competes in the NILL) and WDFY (Washington Drug-Free Youth).

Band/Orchestra
Musical classes and programs vary from concert band to wind ensemble to jazz band to pep band, along with marching band. The University Marching band has won a national title (1983) and consistently makes finals in its various competitions.

Sports

Sports at University High School include: baseball, boys and girls basketball, cheerleading, boys and girls cross country, dance team, football, boys and girls golf, gymnastics, boys and girls soccer, fastpitch softball, slowpitch softball, boys and girls tennis, boys and girls track, volleyball, and wrestling.

Central Valley High School is U-High's rival.  Most of the sports events against them have names and are a major part of the school tradition.  The most-attended competition, the Stinky Sneaker, had to be moved to the Spokane Arena to accommodate the number of students and teachers present.  Almost the entire population of both schools attend this basketball game.  The prize is the Stinky Sneaker, an old shoe painted half crimson and gold and half blue and white.  The second most-attended CV-U-High sporting event is the football game between the two schools, called the Greasy Pig. The third most-attended match is the wrestling match, called the Battle of the Bone.  The soccer game is called the Muddy Cleat, and most of the other sports have names for their CV-U-High rivalry games.

State championships
1992 Girls Cross Country
1997 Boys Cross Country
1998 Boys Cross Country
1998 Boys Track
1999 Boys Cross Country
1999 Boys Track
2003 Fastpitch Softball
2005 Wrestling
2010 Wrestling
2013 Wrestling

Notable faculty & alumni
Jeff Schmedding, college football coach for the Auburn Tigers
Zack Davisson, writer and translator
Chad Carpenter, Head Coach Snow College Softball Program
Brett Bailey (basketball), former professional basketball player
Angie Bjorklund, basketball player, Tennessee Lady Vols all-time 3-pointers record holder with 300 made 
Joe Dahl, professional football player for Detroit Lions
Tyler Olson, professional baseball player, pitcher for Cleveland Indians
Brad Walker, pole vaulter, world champion and American record holder
Michael Conklin, mathematics teacher, recipient of 2015 Presidential Award for Excellence in Mathematics and Science Teaching for Washington State.

References

External links

High schools in Spokane County, Washington
School buildings completed in 2002
Spokane Valley, Washington
2002 establishments in Washington (state)
Public high schools in Washington (state)